Provincial Road 238 (PR 238), also known as River Road, is a provincial road in the Canadian province of Manitoba, in the Rural Municipality of St. Andrews.

Route description
PR 238 begins at the junction of Provincial Trunk Highway 9 (PTH 9) and PTH 27 near the settlement of Parkdale. It follows a scenic route along the west bank of the Red River north to Lockport, terminating at PTH 44 near the St. Andrews Lock and Dam. River Road itself continues north as a municipal road and ends at PTH 9 near Lower Fort Garry.

History
River Road, or Inner Road, was constructed in the early 1800s to connect settlements along the Red River, such as St. Andrews and St. Clements, to the King's Road (present-day PTH 9) between Upper and Lower Fort Garry. As a parish road during the Red River Settlement-era, it was maintained by the local parishes using statue labour. It later became a provincial road in the late 19th century and then designated as Provincial Road 238 after Manitoba's current secondary road system was established in the 1960s.

Points of interest
There are numerous points of interest along PR 238, including four National Historic Sites: 
St. Andrews-on-the-Red Anglican Church National Historic Site
St. Andrews Rectory National Historic Site
Twins Oaks National Historic Site
St. Andrews Lock and Dam

Provincial and municipal historic sites along PR 238 include:
Firth (Hay) House
Scott House
Kennedy House

River Road Provincial Park, created in 1997, is located at several sites along the road.

Gallery

References

External links 
Official Highway Map of Manitoba - Winnipeg

238